Skafidia is a village and a community in the municipality of Pyrgos, Elis, Greece. It is situated on the Ionian Sea coast, at the foot of a low hill. It is 1 km north of Leventochori, 3 km southwest of Myrtia and 11 km northwest of Pyrgos. In 2011, Skafidia had a population of 122 for the village and 211 for the community, which includes the small villages Kalakaiika and Patronikolaiika. The site of the ancient town of Dyspontium is within its area.

Population

External links
 Skafidia GTP Travel Pages

See also
List of settlements in Elis

References

Populated places in Elis